Peter Scott Williams (born 13 December 1986) is a British racing cyclist, who most recently rode for UCI Continental team .

Major results

2004
 Junior Tour of Wales
1st  Points classification
1st  Mountains classification
2008
 2nd Shay Elliott Memorial Race
 2nd Beaumont Trophy
2009
 1st  Overall Tobago International
 3rd Overall Girvan Three Day
2010
 2nd Overall FBD Insurance Rás
 2nd Clayton Velo Spring Classic
 3rd Beaumont Trophy
2011
 1st  Overall Tour of Ulster
1st Stage 2
 5th Overall An Post Rás
2012
 1st  Sprints classification Tour of Britain
 5th Beaumont Trophy
 6th Rutland–Melton CiCLE Classic
 7th Grand Prix des Marbriers
2013
 8th Rutland–Melton CiCLE Classic
2014
 8th Overall An Post Rás
2015
 1st Clayton Velo Spring Classic
 1st Eddie Soens Memorial Handicap
 1st Huddersfield Criterium
 Tour of Britain
1st  Mountains classification
1st  Sprints classification
 3rd Overall Bałtyk–Karkonosze Tour
1st Stage 1
 3rd Ryedale Grand Prix
 10th Beaumont Trophy
2016
 2nd Tro-Bro Léon
 3rd Overall Ronde van Midden-Nederland
1st Stage 1 (TTT)
 4th Time trial, National Road Championships
 4th Beaumont Trophy
2017
 1st Beaumont Trophy
 1st Stage 1 (TTT) Ronde van Midden-Nederland
2018
 6th Rutland–Melton CiCLE Classic

References

External links

 

British male cyclists
Living people
1986 births
Sportspeople from Southport